Margarita Anatolyevna Ponomaryova (19 June 1963 – 16 September 2021), also known as Margarita Khromova, was a hurdler from Russia, best known for setting the world record in the women's 400 metres hurdles in 1984 with 53.58 secs.

Ponomaryova was known by her married name of Khromova from 1985 to 1989, before reverting to her maiden name from 1990 onward.

Career
Ponomaryova was born in Balkhash, Kazakh SSR in the former Soviet Union. She began her international career by winning two medals at the 1981 European Junior Championships.

In 1984, she made a dramatic improvement in the 400 metres hurdles to break the world record with 53.58 secs on 22 June in Kiev, to become the first woman to run below 54 seconds for the event. She was prevented from competing in that years Los Angeles Olympics due to the Soviet boycott.

1984 proved to be the only year where Ponomaryova would be the world's number one 400 m hurdler, however her international career would continue for another decade. In 1985, now competing as Margarita Khromova, she finished sixth in the World Cup in Canberra. In 1986, she reached the European Championship final in Stuttgart, placing eighth. The following year she was a semi-finalist at the World Championships in Rome, narrowly missing the final.

Having failed to make the 1988 Seoul Olympics, she won her biggest individual title when winning at the 1989 World Student Games (Universiade). In 1990, (as Margarita Ponomaryova), she finished fifth in the European Championship final in Split. She won the 1991 European Cup ahead of Sally Gunnell, before finishing eighth later that year in the World Championship final in Tokyo.

Ponomaryova represented the Unified team at the 1992 Barcelona Olympics. In the semi-finals she ran 53.98 sec, to qualify for the final as the third fastest. However, in the final she only managed 54.83 to finish sixth. At the following years World Championships in Stuttgart, she reached her peak running 53.48 sec to win the bronze medal. This was her first (and only) individual medal at Olympic or World Championship level. The race was won by Sally Gunnell in a then world record of 52.74. Ponomaryova also won a silver medal in the 4x400 metres relay.

International competitions

References
 

1963 births
2021 deaths
People from Karaganda Region
Soviet female hurdlers
Russian female hurdlers
Kazakhstani female hurdlers
Olympic female hurdlers
Olympic athletes of the Unified Team
Athletes (track and field) at the 1992 Summer Olympics
Universiade gold medalists in athletics (track and field)
Universiade gold medalists for the Soviet Union
Universiade bronze medalists for the Soviet Union
Medalists at the 1989 Summer Universiade
Competitors at the 1986 Goodwill Games
World Athletics Championships athletes for the Soviet Union
World Athletics Championships athletes for Russia
World Athletics Championships medalists
World Athletics Indoor Championships medalists
CIS Athletics Championships winners
Russian Athletics Championships winners
World record setters in athletics (track and field)
Friendship Games medalists in athletics